WAsP (Wind Atlas Analysis and Application Program) is a Windows program for predicting wind climates, wind resources, and energy yields from wind turbines and wind farms. The predictions are based on wind data measured at meteorological stations in the same region, or on generalised wind climates derived from mesoscale model results. The program includes a complex terrain flow model, a roughness change model, a model for sheltering obstacles, a wind turbine wake model and a model for the average atmospheric stability conditions at the site. The software package further contains a Climate Analyst for creating the wind-climatological inputs, a Map Editor for creating and editing the topographical inputs, and a Turbine Editor for creating the wind turbine inputs to WAsP. The fundamentals of WAsP and the wind atlas methodology are described in the European Wind Atlas. WAsP is developed and distributed by DTU Wind and Energy Systems at the Technical University of Denmark, Denmark. Current version is WAsP 12.7.

WAsP is used for:
 Wind farm production
 Wind farm efficiency
 Micro-siting of wind turbines
 Power production calculations
 Wind resource mapping
 Wind climate estimation
 Wind atlas generation
 Wind data analysis
A special implementation of the WAsP software has been used to map the wind climate of the entire world with a resolution of 250 m, see the Global Wind Atlas.

References

External links
 The official site of WAsP
 The Global Wind Atlas
 Department of Wind and Energy Systems, DTU

Wind power
Earth sciences software